Isocoma drummondii, the Drummond's goldenbush, is a North American plant species in the family Asteraceae. It has been found on both sides of the Río Grande, in Tamaulipas and in southern Texas.

Isocoma drummondii is a completely hairless shrub up to 100 cm (40 inches) tall. The plant produces flower heads in clusters on the tips of branches, each head containing 22–34 disc flowers but no ray flowers.

References

drummondii
Flora of Tamaulipas
Flora of Texas
Plants described in 1842